Vibrio mytili is a Gram-negative species of bacterium in the genus Vibrio. Strains of this species were originally isolated from mussels harvested in the Atlantic Ocean near the coast of Spain.

References

External links
Type strain of Vibrio mytili at BacDive -  the Bacterial Diversity Metadatabase

Vibrionales
Bacteria described in 1993